Euastrum is a genus of green algae of the Desmidiaceae family. It lives in acidic waters.

Description 
It is made of two, symmetrical semicells. They are usually longer than wide and are wavy and lobed. On the ends of the semicells, there is a notch. The cell wall may have "protuberances;" however, they are hard to see.

References

External links

Scientific references

Scientific databases

 
 AlgaTerra database
 Index Nominum Genericorum

Desmidiaceae
Charophyta genera